Wayne Noel Guppy  (born 31 August 1954) is a New Zealand local-body politician. He has been the Mayor of Upper Hutt since 2001.

Early life 
Guppy was born in Upper Hutt on 31 August 1954, the son of Colin Guppy, a police officer, and Joy Guppy. He was educated at St. Patrick's College, Silverstream, and obtained a Doctor of Pharmacy from the University of Nebraska Medical Center.

In 1987, Guppy was a lecturer in clinical pharmacy at Hutt Hospital, and group chairman of the pharmacy practice department at Upper Hutt's Central Institute of Technology, while his wife, Sue, ran Guppy's Dispensary in Upper Hutt.

Personal life 
Guppy is married to Sue and they have two daughters. They live in the Upper Hutt suburb of Heretaunga. Guppy is currently the president of the Upper Hutt Rugby Football Club. He is a justice of the peace.

Mayor of Upper Hutt 
Guppy was first elected to the Upper Hutt City Council in 1998 and was the chair of the Consents Committee for that three-year term. At the next local body election in 2001, he was elected Mayor of Upper Hutt with a majority of around 6,000 votes and has been mayor since. In the 2007 local election, he was returned unopposed. Guppy and Chris Hipkins launched a petition in 2009 opposing the proposed merger of the Upper Hutt and Lower Hutt police districts.

References

1954 births
Living people
Mayors of places in the Wellington Region
People from Upper Hutt
University of Nebraska Medical Center alumni
People educated at St. Patrick's College, Silverstream
Hutt Valley District Health Board members